Coleonyx is a genus of terrestrial geckos commonly referred to as banded geckos. Species of Coleonyx are found in the southwestern United States, Mexico, and Central America. Banded Geckos enjoy dry, warm weather which is why they are typically found in the Peninsular Desert. They are relatively small lizards, measuring about  inches in total length (including tail). They are nocturnal and are found primarily in dry, rocky habitats. Banded Geckos have preyed by snakes, their main predators being rattlesnakes and glossy snakes. Banded Geckos can decipher how they should react when they obtain a chemical cue based on their knowledge of the predator. A main resource they use to distract the predator is losing their tail or escaping quickly. Banded Geckos possess heteromorphic euchromatic sex chromosomes which play a large role in their historical contingency.

Species 
 Coleonyx brevis (Stejneger, 1893) – Texas banded gecko
 Coleonyx elegans  – Yucatán banded gecko
 Coleonyx elegans nemoralis (Klauber, 1945)
 Coleonyx elegans elegans (Gray, 1845)
 Coleonyx fasciatus (Boulenger, 1885) – black banded gecko
 Coleonyx mitratus (Peters, 1863) – Central American banded gecko
 Coleonyx nemoralis Klauber, 1945
 Coleonyx reticulatus (Davis & Dixon, 1958) – reticulate banded gecko
 Coleonyx switaki (Murphy, 1974) – Switak's banded gecko
 Coleonyx gypsicolus (Grismer & Ottlery, 1988)
 Coleonyx variegatus Baird, 1858 – western banded gecko
 Coleonyx variegatus abbotti (Klauber, 1945)
 Coleonyx variegatus bogerti (Klauber, 1945)
 Coleonyx variegatus peninsularis (Klauber, 1945)
 Coleonyx variegatus slevini (Klauber, 1945)
 Coleonyx variegatus sonoriensis (Klauber, 1945)
 Coleonyx variegatus utahensis (Klauber, 1945)
 Coleonyx variegatus variegatus (Baird, 1858)

References

External links

 
Lizard genera
Taxa named by John Edward Gray